The Blazing Forest is a 1952 American lumberjack adventure film directed by Edward Ludwig and written by Lewis R. Foster and Winston Miller. The film stars John Payne, William Demarest, Agnes Moorehead, Richard Arlen, Susan Morrow, Roscoe Ates and Lynne Roberts. The film was released in December 1952, by Paramount Pictures.

Plot
Determined to keep her struggling Nevada timber business going, Jessie Crain borrows money from long-ago sweetheart Syd Jessup while also promising lumberman Kelly Hansen a quarter of her profits if he will become her foreman.

Sharon Wilks, restless niece of Jessie who yearns to leave this region and move to the city, is attracted to Kelly immediately. Jessie's crew, meanwhile, resents Kelly's hard-driving ways, including making everyone work in a torrential rain to meet a lumber quota.

A job is given to Jessie's brother, lumberjack Joe Morgan, whose embezzling has forced Jessie to pay his debts. Joe continues to create trouble for the lumberman as well as for Grace, his estranged wife. A resentful Syd, meantime, causes a crash in a speeding truck that starts a forest fire and fatally injures Joe. A helicopter rescue saves lives and the business, as Kelly persuades Sharon to stay by his side.

Cast 
John Payne as Kelly Hansen
William Demarest as Syd Jessup
Agnes Moorehead as Jessie Crain
Richard Arlen as Joe Morgan
Susan Morrow as Sharon Wilks
Roscoe Ates as Beans
Lynne Roberts as Grace Hanson
Walter Reed as Max
Ewing Mitchell as Walt

Comic book adaptation
 Eastern Color Movie Love #15 (June 1952)

References

External links 
 

1952 films
1952 adventure films
American adventure films
1950s English-language films
Films directed by Edward Ludwig
Films set in forests
Films about lumberjacks
Paramount Pictures films
Films adapted into comics
1950s American films